Kožušany-Tážaly is a municipality in Olomouc District in the Olomouc Region of the Czech Republic. It has about 900 inhabitants.

Administrative parts
The municipality is made up of villages of Kožušany and Tážaly.

Geography
It is located in the Upper Morava Valley on the right bank of the Morava River.

History

The first written mention of Tážaly is from 1078, it is one of the oldest villages in the region. The first written mention of Kožušany is from 1297. From 1568 to 1782, both villages were owned by the St. Catherine Monastery in Olomouc. Kožušany and Tážaly were two separate municipalities until 1960 when they were merged.

The Chapel of Saint Anne in Kožušany was built in 1750. In 1880 the elementary school was built.

Notable people
David Rozehnal (born 1980), footballer; raised here and lives here

References

External links

Villages in Olomouc District